Forensic Science Institute of Turkey is located in Istanbul, Turkey. It was designed by Turkish architect Günay Erdem and landscape architects Sunay Erdem and Serpil Öztekin Erdem.

Quick facts 
Total land area: 
Total buildings area: 
Functions: theoretical training areas, practical training areas, faculties, laboratories, library, administrative units, sports center, indoor swimming pool, hotel, convention center, refectory, student clubs, training pond, technology and research center
Project Cost: $300 million
Population: 2000 students

References 

Universities and colleges in Turkey
Buildings and structures in Istanbul